Kanagal may refer to:

 Kanagal, Mysore, a village in Karnataka state, India
 Kanagal, Nalgonda, a mandal in Telangana state, India